The Nash County Confederate Monument is a Confederate memorial in Rocky Mount, North Carolina, United States. The monument is slated to be removed in 2020.

See also

 List of monuments and memorials removed during the George Floyd protests

References

1917 establishments in North Carolina
1917 sculptures
Monuments and memorials in the United States removed during the George Floyd protests
Buildings and structures in Nash County, North Carolina
Monuments and memorials in North Carolina
Rocky Mount, North Carolina